Sabarmati Thermal Power Station or Torrent Sabarmati Thermal Power Station is coal-fired power plant. It is located in Ahmedabad, Gujarat. The power plant is owned by Torrent Power.

Capacity
The first power plant at this site became operational in 1934 with installed capacity of 37.5 MW (2x3.75MW and 4x7.5MW). In the place of original power plant, new power plant came up with installed capacity of 422 MW (1x60MW, 1x120 MW and 2x121MW).

References 

Coal-fired power stations in Gujarat
Buildings and structures in Ahmedabad
Energy infrastructure completed in 1999
1999 establishments in Gujarat
20th-century architecture in India